This article comprises a list of characters that do not exist in Masami Kurumada's Saint Seiya manga and are found only in its anime adaptation, therefore they remain out of the canon of the fictional universe. Saint Seiya author Kurumada was not involved in their creation process, design or conceptualization and although these characters had a participation in the storyline to some extent, they have now been retconned from the continuity of the anime adaptation to keep it closer to Kurumada's manga. They range from support secondary characters to various ally or antagonistic factions.

Steel Saints

The Steel Saints'  armors were created by Dr. Asamori, who was supported at the beginning by Mitsumasa Kido. Unlike the other Saints, the Steel Saints' powers come from their robotic armors and not from their Cosmo.

Ghost Saints

The Caribbean Saints or Ghost Saints are a group of rogue bounty hunters hailing from the Island of Hell. They were sent by the Pope to retrieve the Gold Cloth, and none of them succeeded nor survived. Although they are also known collectively by the alternate name of Ghost Saints, they are not to be confused with the quintet of the same name appearing in the first Saint Seiya theatrical release.

Black Saints

A trio of Black Saints in Death Queen Island, subordinated to Jango, who tried to prevent Ikki from taking the Phoenix Cloth. Their design is inspired by Black Saints drawn by Masami Kurumada in the backgrounds of vol. 5 of his manga, as well as the event they take part in.

The equivalent to Phoenix Ikki among the Black Saints. Unlike Ikki's four shadows, who were of a seemingly incorporeal nature, the Black Phoenix Saint was flesh and blood, an underling of Django, who, along him and the Black Three tried to kill Phoenix Ikki during his brief return to Death Queen Island, after the defeat of Perseus Algol, Kerberos Dante and Auriga Capella. Black Phoenix fell before Ikki, along his comrades, who suffered the same fate.

The previous Pope

The , the legitimate and benevolent Pope, who awarded Seiya the Pegasus Cloth. He was killed by Gemini Saga to usurp his authority, who hid his corpse in Star Hill, where it remained for over 10 years. Said to be the younger brother of the Pope before him, Aries Shion. Although the events he takes part in are taken directly from Kurumada's manga, this character can't be reconciled with an equivalent in it due to plentiful conflicting storyline aspects, as in Kurumada's work, the Pope killed by Saga was Aries Shion, and the Pope Seiya knew was Saga himself. As with all the anime-only characters, he was retconned from the anime continuity with the adaptation of the Hades arc from Kurumada's manga.

Pope Arles' Minions

The identity given to Gemini Saga in the guise of the false Pope of Sanctuary in the anime adaptation. In Kurumada's manga, Saga as the false Pope goes unidentified by name. Arles was the moving force behind the corruption of Athena's Sanctuary. According to screenwriter of Saint Seiya anime, Takao Koyama, in an interview, Arles name comes from the Greek philosopher Aristotle (Greek: Aristotélēs, Japanese: アリストテレス Arisutoteresu).

Chief of Staff of Sanctuary, he oversaw the execution of the Pope's plans for retrieving the Sagittarius Gold Cloth.

Assistant and lieutenant to Gigas. Appointed to oversee the assassination of the Bronze Saints.

Rankless Saints

A gigantic Saint without rank and constellation who is a henchman of the false Pope. Brother of Cassios. His main attack was called . According to screenwriter of Saint Seiya anime, Takao Koyama, in an interview, his name comes from the word , and based on the name of the classical Greek philosopher .

An unnamed Saint loyal to Gigas and sent by the Pope to retrieve the Gold Cloth. Killed by Phoenix Ikki. His main attack was called .

First introduced as Cygnus Hyōga's master in the anime (as opposed to the manga, in which Aquarius Camus was Hyōga's master), and later retconned. In the anime, Camus was the Crystal Saint's master. His Cloth resembles a snowflake when not being worn. A very honorable and righteous Saint, Crystal Saint was considered a threat by Pope Arles, who forced him into his control with the Maōken technique. After an emotional battle with Hyōga, Crystal Saint took his own life to stop Sanctuary from conquering East Siberia. After his death, he was gradually replaced in the anime adaptation by Camus as Hyōga's master and any events concerning him were disregarded in the continuity to stay true to Kurumada's manga.

A Saint without rank and constellation and one of Pope Arles's henchmen sent along Perseus Algol and Ophiuchus Shaina to assassinate the Bronze Saints. He failed on his mission. His main technique was called .

Anime-only Silver Saints

The animated equivalent of Cepheus Daidalos from Kurumada's manga. Mentor to Andromeda Shun and Chameleon June. Although his background and personality and the events he takes part in are identical to those depicted in Kurumada's work, (except the fact he battled two Gold Saints, as opposed to the manga, in which he only fought against Pisces Aphrodite) Albiore's physique, Cloth and name differ from those of the original character Daidalos from the manga.

A Silver Saint without constellation sent by Sanctuary to retrieve the Gold Cloth. Killed by Pegasus Seiya in Jamir. His name is a reference to the Greek myth of Arachne, a maiden who was turned into a spider after she bested the Goddess Athena in a weaving contest. Note: Actually Tarantula is not a constellation, but a nebula.

A Silver Saint, disciple of Virgo Shaka along with Lotus Aghora. He tried to kill Phoenix Ikki on Canon Island. Like Shaka, Shiva was an adept of Buddhism and relied on Shingon chants and prayer to paralyze his opponents, while performing his murderous , a lightning-fast multi-hit technique. Although a buddhist himself, Shiva was not a practitioner of his religion's peaceful and merciful doctrine and precepts. Killed by Phoenix Ikki. His name is a reference to the Hindu god Shiva, and the peacock is a reference to Mahamayuri.

A Silver Saint, disciple of Virgo Shaka, sent to Canon Island to kill Phoenix Ikki. In the same way as his partner Shiva, Aghora relied on a fighting style based on shingon chants of the Lotus Sutra, which proved ineffective against the Phoenix Saint, who killed him. His name is a reference to the Aghori (Sanskrit Aghora), ascetic Shaiva sadhus in Hinduism. Note: unlike "Pavo" (or the Peacock), which is a constellation, the "Lotus" is merely a symbol which is frequently used in religions such as Hinduism and Buddhism.

Odin's Asgardians
The Asgardian characters appear in the anime adaptation only.

The king of Asgard and the Norse god incarnate. His essence is trapped within the seven  held within his God Warrior's God Robes. His  can only be awakened with the energy from the Sapphires.

A beautiful and powerful young woman who is Odin's representative on Earth and priestess of Asgard. Her younger sister Freya contacts Saori and asks her and the Saints for help.
Saori quickly sets up a strategy: She will take Hilda's place temporarily as the one who prays to avoid the melting of the Polar Ice, while the Bronze Saints fight Hilda's Guardians to reach her. Hilda is finally freed after fighting Seiya, who awakened the Odin God Robe and the legendary sword Balmung with all Odin Sapphires, and returns to her gentle self. It's also revealed that Poseidon locked her spirit away in the Nibelung Ring as her body was controlled by him, torturing her psychologically since she could only watch her warriors die one by one.
Her name is a reference to Brunhild, Siegfried's lover, who gave her the magical ring Andvaranaut taken from the dragon Fafnir unaware that the ring was cursed.

Younger sister of Polaris Hilda. After being the first person (aside from Alberich) who notices the drastic change in her sister, she seeks out Saori and her Saints for help, freeing Hyōga from jail (he had been sent as a scout and then captured) and joining him, therefore she is branded as a traitor. She was deeply saddened for the battle, as she did not want it to come to be between Merak Hägen and Cygnus Hyōga; who was her first friend (and possible love interest) among the Bronze Saints, and Hägen was her bodyguard and best friend since childhood.
Her name is a reference to goddess Freya.

Odin's God Warriors 
They wear armors known as  themed after mythological creatures from Norse mythology and named after the stars of Ursa Major.

He is said to be the strongest warrior among the God Warriors and the second in command after Hilda. He is very loyal to Hilda and seems to harbor deeper feelings for her. In the beginning, he does not believe the Saints when they tell him that Hilda is being controlled by the Niebelungen Ring. However, after Poseidon's Sea General Siren Sorento arrived and told the truth, he switched sides and sacrificed himself to kill Siren Sorento (although Sorento was thought to have died, he actually survived and returns to Poseidon). His armor resembles the dragon Fafner. He is commented to be "invulnerable", in the same way as the Norse legendary hero Siegfried, one of the reasons why he is considered the strongest God Warrior. He shared a common weakness with Shiryū, namely the exposure of the location of his heart, during an attack. It is a common weakness which all Saints (who bear a dragon in their cloth) share.

Since childhood, he lived in the Valhalla Palace training in the cold mountain peaks and volcanic caves in Asgard with the purpose of protecting Hilda and Freya. Jealous of Hyōga's relationship with Freya, Hägen fought against him but was defeated by the freezing blast of the Aurora Execution. 
His God Robe resembles Sleipnir, the eight-legged horse owned by Odin, and his name is a reference to Hagen, the slayer of Siegfried, killing the hero during a hunt, wounding him on the only part of his body which was not invulnerable.

Thor was a poor Asgard villager who stole riches from the wealthy and gave it to the poor, similar to Robin Hood. At some point, though, he was severely injured by the Valhalla Palace guardians when he tried to hunt near the Palace. Almost dying, he is forgiven and healed by Odin's priestess Polaris Hilda, despite his harsh words about her reign. Ever since he felt her pure and warm Cosmo, and was moved by Hilda's frustration about not being able to help everyone in Asgard despite being Odin's priestess, Thor swore to protect her as her guardian.
Despite noticing that Hilda's Cosmo had changed, he fought against Athena's Saints hoping that she would return to being the kind person she once was. He even threw one of his hand axes against Saori, and when she returned it to him with her Cosmo, he praised her strength. Finally, he asked Seiya to rescue Hilda after being defeated.
His armor resembles Jörmungandr, the sea serpent, who faced the Norse god Thor at the Battle of Ragnarök.

Descendant of a renowned family of warriors and scholars in Asgard, Alberich was famous for his intelligence and cunning, as well as for his cold heart; his own fellow warriors didn't trust him, and Hilda herself lectured him often. He was the only witness of Hilda's possession by Poseidon's Nibelung ring; taking advantage of this war, he planned to conquer the world. He defeated many of Athena's Saints (including Eagle Marin), encasing several of them in life-sucking giant amethysts; however, Shiryū, with the help of his master Dohko finally defeated him. He was one of the most shrewd, sly warriors as he could have nature fight for him and used his intelligence to avoid fighting.
His God Robe resembles gemstones of the treasure of the Nibelungen that Alberich (the chief of the Nibelungen) guards.

Fenrir was a member of one of the most powerful and richest families in Asgard. One day, when he and his family went hunting, they were attacked by a bear. Helped by wolves and abandoned by humans, he started to live with wolves adopting their life style and deeply hating humans. Later, he was chosen by Hilda as the Epsilon God Warrior. He died fighting against Shiryū when an avalanche fell over him and his wolves.
His God Robe resembles that of his namesake Fenrir, the wolf child of Loki prophesied to bring about Ragnarök.

He was the first God Warrior to be introduced in the Asgard arc. He was sent to Sanctuary to 'declare' war against Athena. He defeated Taurus Aldebaran with one blow (it was later revealed that a hidden force helped him). Then he went to Japan to kill Athena, he was stopped by Seiya and Shun, and he returned to his country waiting for the Saints to come and fight there. He was defeated by Shun's Nebula Storm in the Valhalla palace. Before his death, it was revealed he always knew about his twin brother, Alcor Zeta Bud, and both he and his parents always regretted having abandoned him, but were unable to do anything in his favor. His God Robe is that of a saber-toothed cat.

Syd and Bud are twins who were born into a very wealthy family in Asgard. Due to local superstitions that twins bring bad luck to the family, Bud's parents were forced to abandon the younger twin, Bud. A poor man raised him as his own child, until one day, during hunting, Bud encountered his twin brother Syd and the parents who abandoned him. Hilda made of him a shadow God Warrior, saying he would replace Syd as the real God Warrior only when Syd died. He held much hatred against his brother Syd for all of this; yet after much convincing from Ikki (Phoenix Genma Ken included), he realized that all his actions (helping Syd to defeat Aldebaran, and later Shun when Syd was losing the battle) was due to the fact that he loved his brother very much, yet could not admit it. He then carried Syd's body into the blizzard, where Bud presumably died, wishing that he and Syd could again be brothers should they reincarnate. His God Robe, like his brother, is also a saber-toothed cat.

Mime grew up with his father Folker, a powerful warrior who trained him against his will, since Mime himself wanted to be a musician. One day, Mime discovered that Folker had cruelly killed his true parents; guided by his fury and by Folker's boasting, he killed Folker. After defeating Shun, who was deprived of the use of his chains, he fought against Ikki.
At the end of this battle, Mime discovered (by being attacked with the Phoenix Hōō Genma Ken) that Folker actually was a good man who killed Mime's parents unintentionally. He fought Mime's father and spared him when he found out that he was married, yet he still tried to attack and it was then Folker fatally hit him in self-defense, Mime's mother attempted to stop them yet it was too late and both died. Then, Folker heard baby Mime cry in his crib, and out of guilt he took Mime as his child. Ultimately, Folker actually provoked Mime because he wanted to die by his adopted son's hand, to make up for the fatal mistake that cost Mime his true family.
Mime's last words to Ikki were that he wished that in a new life they could both be reborn and be friends.
Mime's God Robe resembles the harp belonging to Bragi, the god of poetry in Norse mythology accused by the god Loki of being the most afraid to fight among the gods, and his name is a reference to the Nibelung dwarf Mime, brother of Alberich. Mime is a character in the operatic cycle Der Ring des Nibelungen by Richard Wagner, he is the Nibelung who forged the cursed Nibelung Ring. The character is based on Regin, foster father of Sigurd (Siegfried) and brother of Fafnir.

Other support characters

Creator of the Steel Saints' mechanical Cloths, under commission by Mitsumasa Kido.

Ōko was Dragon Shiryū's training partner and bitter rival. Though not a saint, he somehow drew his attacks from the tiger, which in most Asian myths and legends is the counterpart of the dragon.

A former Saint apprentice who failed to achieve his goal, he turned to a life of violence with the enormous strength he managed to attain. He dies after falling off a cliff trying to kill Eagle Marin.

A smart police dog who helped Seiya in the search of the Gold Cloth.

Young children, fellow orphans and admirers of Pegasus Seiya in the Star Children Academy, where they grew up together. Although their appearance is based in unidentified orphans appearing in Kurumada's manga, their names are revealed only in the anime adaptation. They also appear in some of the Saint Seiya theatrical releases.

Saint apprentices under Cepheus Albiore and former training partners of Andromeda Shun. Their names refer to Spica and Leda. References of this can be found in the Cloth and chains both wear.

A young girl and an elderly man from Canon Island, whose lives were endangered by the rage of Lotus Agora and Pavo Shiva. Saved by Phoenix Ikki.

The only anime-original character added in the Hades arc adaptation to anime. A girl from Rodorio village, seemingly romantically interested in Taurus Aldebaran.

References

Read also
List of Saint Seiya characters

s